The Gio National Forest is a forest area situated in central Nimba County, Liberia. It was established in 1960 and covers an area of about 327 km.

One of the largest forests in Liberia, located in the southeastern part of the country, is now under threat from locals who are building their farms inside it.

The estimate terrain elevation above sea level is 268 metres.

It is a forest that belongs to the vegetation class V.

Mammals
It is thought that the Dan (Gio) National Forest used to support some populations of chimpanzees, but according to a study published in 2003, these populations have either disappeared or occur in very small groups (Kormos et al. 2003)

References

Kormos, R., Boesch, C., Bakarr, M. I. and Butynski, T. (eds.). (2003) West African Chimpanzees. Status Survey and Conservation Action Plan. IUCN/SSC Primate Specialist Group. IUCN, Gland, Switzerland and Cambridge. Uk.

Protected areas of Liberia
Protected areas established in 1960
Nimba County